Jamie M. Fly is an American business executive and the current president and chief executive officer (CEO) of Radio Free Europe/Radio Liberty.

Education and career 
Fly graduated from American University with a bachelor's degree in international studies and political science and from Georgetown University with a master's degree in German and European studies.

From 2002 to 2004, he worked on European and national security issues as a research associate at the Council on Foreign Relations. In 2004 he was a German Marshall Fund Manfred Wörner Fellow. He also worked at the World Bank and for the Republican National Committee on the 2004 re-election campaign of the 43rd president of the United States George W. Bush. From 2005 to 2008, Fly served in the office of the United States Secretary of Defense. He received the Office of the Secretary of Defence Medal for Exceptional Public Service. From 2008 to 2009, he served as director of anti-proliferation strategy at the United States National Security Council in the Bush's administration. In 2009 he was a Claremont Institute Lincoln Fellow. From early 2009 to February 2013 Fly served as the executive director of the Foreign Policy Initiative (FPI). From February 2013 to May 2017 he served as counselor for Foreign and National Security Affairs to Senator Marco Rubio (R-FL). He also served as a senior fellow, co-director of the Alliance for Securing Democracy.

From 1 August 2019 to June 2020, he served as president and chief executive officer for Radio Free Europe/Radio Liberty (RFE/RL). From September 2020 to February 2021, he served as director of the Future of Geopolitics and Asia programmes at the Marshall Fund. He researched transatlantic relations, foreign policy of the United States, democracy and human rights. Since 16 February 2021, Fly has been president and CEO for RFE/RL.

He is a member of the Council on Foreign Relations.

References 

Living people
American chief executives
Radio Free Europe/Radio Liberty people
Year of birth missing (living people)